Bebington was a parliamentary constituency  in the United Kingdom, which existed from 1950 to 1974. The constituency was centred on the town of Bebington on the Wirral Peninsula, England.

History
Bebington was created by the Representation of the People Act 1948 for the 1950 general election, ceasing to exist with the implementation of the boundary changes brought in for the February 1974 general election.

Boundaries 
The Borough of Bebington, and the County Borough of Birkenhead wards of Bebington, Devonshire, Egerton, Mersey, and Prenton.

The Borough of Bebington and the Prenton ward of the County Borough of Birkenhead had previously been part of the Wirral constituency, with remaining Birkenhead wards being added from the former Birkenhead East constituency.

On abolition in 1974, the Borough of Bebington became part of the new constituency of Bebington and Ellesmere Port, the Prenton ward was returned to Wirral and the remaining wards added to the redrawn Birkenhead constituency.

Members of Parliament

Elections

Elections in the 1950s

Elections in the 1960s

Elections in the 1970s

See also

Bebington and Ellesmere Port (UK Parliament constituency)
History of parliamentary constituencies and boundaries in Cheshire

Sources

Election results, 1950 - 1979

Parliamentary constituencies in North West England (historic)
Constituencies of the Parliament of the United Kingdom established in 1950
Constituencies of the Parliament of the United Kingdom disestablished in 1974